The  is a Japanese dialect spoken in the Hida region of Gifu Prefecture, Japan. Along with the Mino dialect in the south, it is one of the two main dialects of Gifu Prefecture.

The phrase「楽しんでください」(Literally "Please have fun") is more commonly「楽しみない」(Literally "Not excited") in Hida-ben

References

Sources

See also
Japanese dialects
Your Name

Japanese dialects
Culture in Gifu Prefecture
Hida Province